The zempoaltepec (Peromyscus melanocarpus) is a species of rodent in the family Cricetidae. It is found in the Sierras de Zempoaltépec, Juárez, and Mazteca, sub-ranges of the Sierra Madre de Oaxaca in southern Mexico, between 1,500 and 2,500 meters elevation.

References

 Musser, G. G. and M. D. Carleton. (2005). Superfamily Muroidea. pp. 894–1531 in Mammal Species of the World a Taxonomic and Geographic Reference. D. E. Wilson and D. M. Reeder eds. Johns Hopkins University Press, Baltimore.

Peromyscus
Mammals described in 1904
Rodents of North America
Endemic mammals of Mexico
Fauna of the Sierra Madre de Oaxaca
Taxa named by Wilfred Hudson Osgood
Taxonomy articles created by Polbot